Haaren is a town and former municipality in the southern Netherlands, in the province of North Brabant.

The former municipality of Haaren ceased to exist on 1 January 2021. It was divided among four municipalities: Boxtel, Oisterwijk, Tilburg, and Vught.

The former municipality of Haaren contained three other villages: Helvoirt, Esch, and Biezenmortel. An unusual thing about the municipality was that it belonged to two regions, Tilburg and 's-Hertogenbosch. The village belongs to the region of Tilburg. The eastern part of national park the Loonse en Drunense Duinen was part of the municipality.

Haaren is known as 'The Garden of Brabant' because of the many plantations of trees, plants etc.

Population centres 
 Biezenmortel (1,498) added to Tilburg
 Esch (2,225) added to Boxtel
 Haaren (5,584) added to Oisterwijk
 Helvoirt (4,741) added to Vught

(Population in 2003)

Topography

Dutch topographic map of the municipality of Haaren, June 2015

Gallery

References

External links 

Populated places in North Brabant
Former municipalities of North Brabant
Municipalities of the Netherlands disestablished in 2021
Oisterwijk